Big Fork Creek is a stream in eastern Polk County, Arkansas. It is a tributary of the Ouachita River. The stream flows east then turns north and crosses under Arkansas Route 8 near Abernathy Springs. It flows generally north passing Big Fork and Opal to its confluence with the Ouachita River one mile south of the community of Cherry Hill.

References

Rivers of Arkansas